Diego Garavito (born 30 June 1972) is a Colombian cyclist. He competed in the men's cross-country mountain biking event at the 2000 Summer Olympics.

References

External links
 

1972 births
Living people
Colombian male cyclists
Olympic cyclists of Colombia
Cyclists at the 2000 Summer Olympics
Sportspeople from Bogotá